Danesville is an unincorporated community in Dodge and  Olmsted counties, Minnesota, United States.

Notes

Unincorporated communities in Dodge County, Minnesota
Unincorporated communities in Olmsted County, Minnesota
Unincorporated communities in Minnesota